Radoslav Gondoľ (born 7 May 1991 in Košice) is a Slovak football defender who currently plays for the Slovak Corgoň Liga club MFK Košice.

Career
He made his debut for MFK Košice against Slovan Bratislava on 24 September 2011.

External links
MFK Košice profile

References

1991 births
Living people
Slovak footballers
Association football defenders
FC VSS Košice players
Slovak Super Liga players
Place of birth missing (living people)
Sportspeople from Košice